Evan Jones is an Australian musician and photographer. Together with his brother Idris he wrote "The Pushbike Song".

Jones was in an Adelaide band called the Gingerbread Men before his career was interrupted by military service in Vietnam. Also in the band was Idris Jones, Tony McNicoll and Dean Birbeck. They released a single in the 60s, "Looking At You" / "Goodnight" (1965, W&G). 

Idris Jones was later a member of The Mixtures. The Jones brothers wrote their song "The Pushbike Song" which was released by the band in 1970. The song charted internationally and reached #1 in Australia.

In 1977 two songs he had written were released by Graham Cornes as a single, "I Gotta Girl" backed with "Untying the Laces" (J & B Records).

In 1981, backed by the band Y Knot, he had a hit with the single "Mm! Mm! Don't Cha Love Summertime!" which reached #85 on the Australian Single Charts.

Jones worked as a children's television host, appearing on Here's Humphrey, C'mon Kids and Cartoon Connection.

Discography

Albums

Singles

References

Living people
Australian male singers
Australian musicians
Year of birth missing (living people)